Arthur Zeiler (born 25 March 1988) is a German international rugby union player, playing for the Heidelberger RK in the Rugby-Bundesliga and the German national rugby union team.

Zeiler played in the 2009, 2010, 2011 and 2012 German championship final for Heidelberger RK, losing the first one and winning the following three.

He made his debut for Germany in an ENC match against Poland on 20 November 2010.

Zeiler began his rugby career in 1994 and has since played for TB Rohrbach and the HRK.

Honours

Club
 German rugby union championship
 Champions: 2010, 2011, 2012, 2013
 Runners up: 2009
 German rugby union cup
 Winners: 2011

Stats
Arthur Zeiler's personal statistics in club and international rugby:

Club

 As of 4 December 2013

National team

European Nations Cup

Friendlies & other competitions

 As of 4 December 2013

References

External links
  Arthur Zeiler at the DRV website
  Arthur Zeiler at totalrugby.de
 

1988 births
Living people
German rugby union players
Germany international rugby union players
Heidelberger RK players
Rugby union props